The Silkworm is a 2014 crime fiction novel by J. K. Rowling, published under the pseudonym Robert Galbraith. It is the second novel in the Cormoran Strike series of detective novels and was followed by Career of Evil in 2015, Lethal White in 2018,Troubled Blood in 2020 and The Ink Black Heart in 2022.

Plot summary
Several months after solving the Lula Landry case, Cormoran Strike is asked by Leonora Quine to locate her novelist husband Owen, a former literary genius whose attempts to recreate his past success have failed. Owen disappeared around the same time his latest book, Bombyx Mori, was leaked. The book has been deemed unpublishable due to its mixture of sexual assault, torture, and cannibalism as well as its slanderous depiction of the people in Owen's life. In addition to Leonora, Strike sets out interviewing the other people portrayed in the manuscript: Owen's lover Kathryn Kent, protégée Pippa Midgley, agent Elizabeth Tassel, editor Jerry Waldegrave, publisher Daniel Chard and former friend Michael Fancourt. The suspects, however, soon turn on one another, accusing and counter-accusing each other of killing Owen and ghost-writing Bombyx Mori.

As the investigation commences, Strike's relationship with Robin Ellacott gradually deteriorates, as she feels neglected by him and he feels unwilling to put her in a position where she is forced to choose between her job and her fiancé Matthew. The animosity is tempered when Strike finds Owen's body, which has been mutilated, doused in acid and posed to resemble the ending of Bombyx Mori. Metropolitan Police later arrest Leonora for the murder, prompting Strike to set out clearing her name. Robin, meanwhile, strains her relationship with Matthew after she almost misses his mother's funeral to help Strike and gets caught telling a lie. She later confronts Strike about his intentions only to be warned that she will be asked to do things Matthew will not like if she becomes an investigator.

With the case against Leonora piling up, Strike focuses on Fancourt, whose character in the manuscript is inconsistent with his relationship to Owen. Several years earlier, after Fancourt's wife Elspeth wrote a novel that was panned by critics, an anonymous parody's release prompted her to kill herself. Fancourt accused Owen of authoring the parody and Tassel of enabling him. Strike soon deduces Bombyx Mori is a metaphor for someone else's life and Owen was intended to be the antagonist rather than the hero. Realising the manuscript was penned by a ghost-writer, he creates a plan to confront the killer. He later approaches Fancourt at a party and asks to speak to him in private. When Tassel, who is also in attendance, joins them, Strike accuses Tassel of being Owen's killer and the ghost-writer.

Tassel, a failed author herself, wrote the parody of Elspeth's novel, which Owen used to blackmail her for twenty years. When he approached her with the original concept for Bombyx Mori, Tassel concocted an elaborate plan. She conspired with Owen to stage his disappearance, rewrote Bombyx Mori, killed Owen and framed Leonora. Tassel attempts to flee, only to be caught and arrested, which Strike and Robin planned in advance. Sometime later, Leonora is released from prison, Fancourt acknowledges the original Bombyx Mori manuscript's literary value, and Strike tells Robin that he enrolled her in investigative training courses as a Christmas gift.

Characters

Main characters
 Cormoran Strike – A veteran of the Afghanistan war who was discharged after losing half of his leg in a bomb attack and wanted to leave fearing insanity. He is a minor celebrity, thanks in part to his notorious rock star father and his solving of a high-profile murder.
 Robin Ellacott – Strike's assistant and secretary who harbours a secret fascination with the world of criminal investigations. Now taking on a full-time role within Strike's agency, she aspires to become an investigator in her own right.

Bombyx Mori characters
 Owen Quine – an author once hailed as an avant-garde writer and one of the first "literary rebels". He has spent decades trying to recreate the success of his first novel, Hobart's Sin, to no avail. He is regarded as narcissistic and insecure in the extreme and only tolerated because of the shadow of untapped potential in his works.
 Quine appears in the Bombyx Mori as Bombyx, an aspiring author whose genius is undisputed, unappreciated, and unsubstantiated, prompting him to seek out his idols, but discovers that they only seek to use him and abuse him before eating him alive.
 Leonora Quine – Quine's wife, who becomes the prime suspect in his murder. She spends almost all of her time caring for their intellectually-disabled daughter, Orlando.
 Leonora appears as Succuba, a demon in the body of a hideous woman who holds Bombyx in bondage and repeatedly rapes him.
 Kathryn Kent – Quine's girlfriend and an author of "fantasy erotica" that has mostly been rejected by the London publishing community.
 Kathryn appears as Harpy, a beautiful woman with a hideous deformity, implied to be a crude and cruel metaphor for breast cancer.
 Pippa Midgley – a transgender woman undergoing therapy ahead of gender reassignment surgery. She becomes enamoured with Quine after taking a creative writing course he taught; Quine, in turn, was inspired by her personal story as it dovetailed with his original novel.
 Pippa appears as Epicoene, a slave to Harpy, who seeks to escape her clutches with Bombyx. Bombyx responds positively until she "sings", or reveals her transgender status to him, which he finds horrifying.
 Elizabeth Tassel – a failed writer who became a literary agent. She lives and works on the fringe of the London literary community, which she deeply resents, and expresses by bullying her staff.
 Tassel appears as The Tick, a parasitic woman who cultivates Bombyx's talent to leech off him.
 Jerry Waldegrave – Quine's long-suffering editor, who is one of the few people willing to tolerate him. His reputation is ruined by Quine's behaviour, leading to the breakdown of his marriage and his turn to alcoholism.
 Jerry appears as The Cutter, a horned, troll-like creature that ruthlessly destroys Bombyx's work. He carries a bloodied sack implied to carry an aborted foetus and attempts to drown other creatures.
 Michael Fancourt – one of the original literary rebels, who went on to become a bestselling author. He maintains literature is an art form, and that art can only be considered as such when it provokes social discussion; however, this is little more than an excuse for his deeply misogynistic opinions.
 Michael appears as Vainglorious, a famous author and Bombyx's idol. He is revealed to be a charlatan, torturing his wife Effigy to fuel his own creativity and passing her torment off as art.
 Daniel Chard – the president of Roper Chard, a London publishing house specialising in modern literature. He lacks social skills and is implied to be a latent homosexual.
 Daniel appears as Phallus Impudicus, a man who murders writers to steal their talent, violating their corpses with his diseased penis.

Other characters
 Matthew Cunliffe – Robin's fiancé, who disapproves of her work with Strike. Despite considerable tension from this, Robin eventually tells him about her lifelong dream of being a detective and Matthew accepts to let her do it although he doesn't much like it.
 Richard Anstis – a detective with the Metropolitan Police who was involved in the incident that cost Strike his leg. Strike considers him a capable investigator, but lacking in imagination.
 Orlando Quine – Quine's intellectually-disabled daughter. She is the only person in Quine's life who does not appear in the Bombyx Mori manuscript, and it is implied that she is the only person he genuinely cares about.
 Lucy – Strike's half-sister on his mother's side, and the only member of his family that he has any regular contact with. Despite being his younger sister, she tends to mother him, encouraging him to settle down and start a family, much to Strike's consternation.
 Alexander 'Al' Rokeby – Strike's half-brother on his father's side, and the only member of his father's side of the family with whom he has any contact.
 Nina Lascelles – a junior editor at Roper Chard who helps Strike acquire the Bombyx Mori manuscript. She becomes enamoured with him and pursues a romantic relationship with him, which is not reciprocated.
 Joe North – an American writer and friend of Quine and Fancourt. He died of AIDS while writing about his experiences living with the disease. After lying abandoned for twenty years, the house where North died became the scene of Quine's murder.
 Christian Fisher – the editor of a niche publishing house who leaks the Bombyx Mori manuscript.
 Dominic Culpepper – an opportunistic tabloid journalist who hires Strike to find evidence of wrongdoing among the rich and powerful. He expresses surprise that Strike does not resort to phone-hacking to acquire evidence.
 Charlotte Campbell Ross – Strike's on-again, off-again former flame. Following the breakdown of their relationship, she has become engaged to another man, but continues to taunt Strike from afar.

Reception
Much like The Cuckoo's Calling, The Silkworm was met with critical acclaim, selling more copies than its predecessor in its opening weeks. Val McDermid from The Guardian gave the novel a positive review, but criticised the descriptions of the different London settings, which she considered superfluous: "I suspect that having spent so many books describing a world only she knew has left her with the habit of telling us rather too much about a world most of us know well enough to imagine for ourselves". The novel was also nominated for a Gold Dagger Award at the Crime Writers' Association Daggers 2015.

In other media

Television

On 10 December 2014, it was announced that the novels would be adapted as a television series for BBC One, starting with The Cuckoo's Calling. Rowling executive produced the series through her production company Brontë Film and Television.

In September 2016, it was announced that Tom Burke was set to play Cormoran Strike, and in November 2016 it was announced that Holliday Grainger had been cast as Strike's assistant, Robin Ellacott. Additional cast of the adaptation include Kerr Logan as Matthew Cunliffe, Monica Dolan as Leonora Quine, Lia Williams as Elizabeth Tassel, Jeremy Swift as Owen Quine, Dorothy Atkinson as Kathryn Kent, Dominic Mafham as Jerry Waldegrave, Tim McInnerny as Daniel Chard, Peter Sullivan as Michael Fancourt, Sargon Yelda as DI Richard Anstis, Sarah Gordy as Orlando Quine and Natasha O'Keeffe as Charlotte Campbell.

The two-episode dramatisation of The Silkworm initially aired in September 2017.

References

2014 British novels
Cormoran Strike series
Sphere Books books
Novels with transgender themes
British novels adapted into television shows